Barking Irons is a design company based on the Bowery in New York City, specializing in casual-contemporary apparel inspired by American folklore and storytelling. The company was started in mid-2003 by brothers Daniel and Michael Casarella and has won several awards including the 2006 Sportswear International Fashion Awards (SIFA) "Best Newcomer Brand" award, and was featured in the New York Times Magazine article, "The Brand Underground."

In 2015, the brand, with creative partners Elliott Phear and Casey McGrath, launched an applejack spirit made from 100% NY apples, prompting the Wall Street Journal to ask, "Is Applejack The New Bourbon?"

History and Meaning 

The name "Barking Irons" comes from a 19th-century slang term for pistols. The term was created by gangs of youths that haunted New York's infamous Bowery. The Bowery, a theatre district for much of the century, was a critical proving ground for indigenous American culture in the 19th century. Uniquely American art forms such as tap-dancing, concert saloons, freak shows, and vaudeville all gained popularity in the Bowery theatres of the time.

Historically Themed Collections 

Barking Irons is known for the extensive historical research and chronicling that is weaved into its products.

Past Barking Irons collections have drawn inspiration from characters such as P.T. Barnum and his fire-tormented American Museum, as well as the notorious reign of Boss Tweed and his Tammany Hall, New York's brawling fire companies, and the devilish dens of the Bowery such as Blind Tiger and Satan's Circus.

Other collections have focused on the literary sons of early New York and America such as the poet Walt Whitman and writers like Herman Melville, Stephen Crane, and musicians such as Lead Belly, Woody Guthrie, and Stephen Foster.

The history inherent to Barking Irons essentially utilizes the strange mystique, stories, and legends of the Bowery as a critical stage for the telling of American folklore through a modern lens.

See also 

 Bowery (Manhattan)
 P.T. Barnum
 Boss Tweed
 American Renaissance
 Gangs of New York

References

External links 
 Official Barking Irons website
 Barking Irons NYC history blog
 NY TIMES article profiling Barking Irons
 

Clothing companies of the United States
Companies based in New York City